Joanna Beresford (born 4 December 1956) is a British television producer and Director of Production for Avalon. She won a Primetime Emmy Award for Outstanding Miniseries for The Lost Prince in 2005 and an International Emmy Kids Award for Animation for The Amazing World of Gumball in 2013. She also won British Academy Children's Awards for Best Animation for The Amazing World of Gumball in 2011 and 2012.

Filmography

References

External links 
 

1996 births
British television producers
British women television producers
Living people